Dalbergia parviflora is a species of liana found in South East Asia. "small flowers" as in the scientific name). The heartwood of the plant is lakawood, an aromatic wood used for incense. The genus Dalbergia is placed in the subfamily Faboideae and tribe Dalbergieae; no subspecies are listed in the Catalogue of Life.

References

External links

parviflora
Flora of Indo-China